Clepsis nevadae is a species of moth of the family Tortricidae. It is found in Venezuela.

The ground colour of the fore wings is pale brownish cream, sprinkled with brownish and with some brown suffusions and costal dots. The hind wings are cream, but darker on the periphery.

Etymology
The species name refers to the area of distribution, the Sierra Nevada.

References

Moths described in 2006
Clepsis